Bauhinia lunarioides is a species of flowering plant in the family Fabaceae, native to Southwestern Texas in the United States and Northern Mexico.  Common names include Texasplume, Anacacho orchid tree, and pata de vaca.

It is a small deciduous tree growing to 4 m tall.  The leaves are 2–5 cm long and broad, rounded, and bilobed at the base and apex.  The flowers are small, white or (rarely) pink, with five petals.  The fruit is a pod.

Though limited in range in the wild, it has become increasingly available in nurseries.

References

External links

lunarioides
Plants described in 1878
Trees of Coahuila
Trees of Nuevo León
Trees of the South-Central United States